Keith Town railway station serves the town of Keith, Moray on the Keith and Dufftown Railway.

History 
The station opened as Earlsmill on 21 February 1862 by the Keith and Dufftown Railway. It was renamed Keith Town on 1 May 1897. The station closed on 6 May 1968 and the station building and booking office were later demolished. In 2005, the Keith and Dufftown Association reopened the station as a preserved station and rebuilt it.

Stationmasters

Robert Milne (formerly station master at Drummuir)
James Maconnachie until 1891
Charles Kennedy 1891 - 1901
Robert Taylor from 1901 (formerly station master at Advie)
Archibald Munro 1931 - 1942 (formerly station master at Peterhead, also station master at Keith)
William Barclay until 1949  (also station master at Keith)
William A. Graham from 1949 (formerly station master at Longtown, Cumberland, also station master at Keith)

References

External links 
Keith Town Video and narration

Disused railway stations in Moray
Railway stations in Great Britain opened in 1862
Railway stations in Great Britain closed in 1968
Beeching closures in Scotland
Former Great North of Scotland Railway stations
1862 establishments in Scotland
Keith, Moray